The following is a timeline of the history of the city of Debrecen, Hungary.

Prior to 20th century

 1317 - .
 1538 -  founded.
 1552 - Town adopted the Protestant faith.
 1686 - Town captured by the imperial forces.
 1693 - Town was made a royal free city.
 1746 -  built.
 1822 - Reformed Great Church built.
 1849
 14 April: Lajos Kossuth proclaimed the deposition of the Habsburg dynasty
 August: Battle of Debrecen (1849).
  established.
  Town captured by the Russians.
 1857 - Budapest-Debrecen railway begins operating.
 1861 -  (park) established.
 1869 - Debrecen newspaper in publication.
 1884 - Horse-drawn tram begins operating.
 1890 - Population: 58,952.
 1893 - Synagogue built on Pásti Street.
 1895 - De Ruyter obelisk erected.
 1897 - Synagogue opens on Deák Ferenc Street.
 1900 - Population: 75,006.

20th century

 1902 -  and Debreceni VSC (sport club) established.
 1903 - Debreceni Független Újság newspaper in publication.
 1910 - Population: 92,729.
 1911
 Electric tram begins operating.
 Debreceni Nagy Újság newspaper in publication.

 1912
 Hungarian Royal University established.
 Debreceni Hírlap newspaper in publication.
 1915 - Grand Hotel Aranybika rebuilt.
 1930
 Debrecen Airport begins operating.
 Population: 116,013.
 1944
 October: Battle of Debrecen.
 21 December: "Provisional National Assembly meets in recently liberated city of Debrecen."
 1950 - Stadion Oláh Gábor Út (stadium) opens (approximate date).
 1955 - Debreceni VSC wins its first Hungarian women's handball championship.
 1958 -  opens.
 1960 - Population: 134,930.
 1961 -  rebuilt.
 1966
 István Ács becomes mayor.
  active.
 1970 - Debreceni Vadkakasok basketball team formed.
 1974 - Population: 179,755.
 1980 - Population: 198,195.
 1981 - Debrecen hosts the 1981 European Judo Championships.
 1985 -  begins operating.
 1988 - Debrecen Philharmonic Orchestra founded.
 1990 - József Hevessy becomes mayor.
 1991
 Debrecen Reformed Theological University active.
 18 August: Visit of Pope John Paul II.
 1993 - Roman Catholic Diocese of Debrecen–Nyíregyháza established.
 1995 - Sister city partnership signed between Debrecen and Lublin, Poland.
 1998 - Lajos Kósa becomes mayor.

21st century

 2002
 February: Főnix Hall arena opens.
 November: Debrecen hosts the 2002 World Artistic Gymnastics Championships.
 2003 -  built.
 2004 - Debrecen co-hosts the 2004 European Women's Handball Championship.
 2005 - Debreceni VSC wins its first Hungarian football championship.
 2006 - Debrecen Swimming Pool Complex opens.
 2007 - Debrecen hosts the 2007 European Short Course Swimming Championships.
 2008 -  built.

 2010 - Debrecen co-hosts the 2010 UEFA Futsal Championship.
 2011 - Population: 211,320.
 2012 - Debrecen co-hosts the 2012 European Aquatics Championships.
 2013 - Debrecen hosts the 2013 World Short Track Speed Skating Championships.
 2014
 Papp László becomes mayor.
 December: Debrecen co-hosts the 2014 European Women's Handball Championship.
 2015
 June: Debrecen co-hosts the EuroBasket Women 2015.
 June: Migrant unrest.
 2020 - Debrecen hosts the 2020 European Short Track Speed Skating Championships.
 2021 - Pope John Paul II monument unveiled in the 30th anniversary of his visit.
 2022 - Debrecen co-hosts the 2022 European Men's Handball Championship.

See also
 Debrecen history
 
 Timelines of other cities in Hungary: Budapest

References

This article incorporates information from the Hungarian Wikipedia.

Bibliography

in English

in other languages

External links

 Europeana. Items related to Debrecen, various dates.
 Digital Public Library of America. Items related to Debrecen, various dates

Debrecen
Debrecen
Debrecen
Hungary history-related lists
Years in Hungary